Otitoma kagoshimaensis is an extinct species of sea snail, a marine gastropod mollusk in the family Pseudomelatomidae, the turrids and allies.

Description

Distribution
Fossils of this marine species were found in Upper Pleistocene strata in Japan.

References

 Shuto, Tsugio. Turrid Gastropods from the Upper Pleistocene Moeshima Shell Bed. Faculty of Science, Kyushu University, 1965.

External links
 Morassi M., Nappo A. & Bonfitto A. (2017). New species of the genus Otitoma Jousseaume, 1898 (Pseudomelatomidae, Conoidea) from the Western Pacific Ocean. European Journal of Taxonomy. 304: 1-30

kagoshimaensis
Gastropods described in 1965